Taypi Q'awa (Aymara taypi center, middle, q'awa little river, ditch, crevice, fissure, gap in the earth, "middle brook" or "middle ravine", hispanicized spelling Taipicahua)  is a mountain in the Wansu mountain range in the Andes of Peru, about  high. It is located in the Arequipa Region, La Unión Province, Puyca District, east of Ikmaqucha.

References 

Mountains of Peru
Mountains of Arequipa Region